The Copenhagen Harbour Buses (Danish: Københavns Havnebusser) is a system of water buses along the harbourfront of Copenhagen, Denmark, operated by Movia which also operates the city’s regular buses. There are four vessels: Holmen, Bryggen, Nordhavn and Nyhavn. The Harbour Buses are integrated into the Copenhagen public transport system with the same payment system as buses, Metro or DSB trains.

Routes and stops
The Copenhagen Harbour Buses network has three routes, serving a total of 11 different stops along the harbourfront, seven on Zealand-side and four on Amager-side. The line network was rationalised in the 2010s, with the former lines 901, 902 and 904 merged into one line running the entire span of the harbour, using two different numbers depending on the direction. The Opera shuttle line was retained, but renamed from 903 to 993.

991 & 992

Routes 991 and  992 serves the following busstops in opposite directions, 991 going south and 992 going north through the harbour. The following are the stops on both lines in the running order of the 991 (southwards) - 992 does the same stops in reverse direction:
 Orientkaj
 Refshaleøen
 Nordre Toldbod
 Holmen North
 Copenhagen Opera House
 Nyhavn
 Knippelsbro
 Royal Danish Library
 Bryggebroen
 Islands Brygge Syd 
 Enghave Brygge
 Teglholmen

993
Route 993 serves as a shuttle service between Nyhavn, Experimentarium and the Opera, Monday-Friday from 9-18, and between the Opera and Nyhavn only between 18-23.

Gallery

See also

 Copenhagen City Bikes
 DFDS Canal Tours

References

External links
 Movia on the Harbour Buses

Transport in Copenhagen
Water transport in Denmark
Port of Copenhagen
Water taxis